Pudur or Puthur means 'new village' in Tamil and Malayalam.
It may refer to:
 Pudur, Erode or 46 Pudur in Erode district
 Pudur, Ranga Reddy
 Pudur, Ambattur
 Pudur, Pudukkottai
 Pudur, Tirunelveli
 Pudur, Palakkad
 Pudur, Tuticorin
 V. Pudur

See also
Puthur (disambiguation)
Puttur (disambiguation)